The  is a cantaloupe cultivar farmed in greenhouses in Yūbari, Hokkaido, a small city close to Sapporo.

The Yubari King is a hybrid of two other cantaloupe cultivars: Earl's Favourite and Burpee's "Spicy" Cantaloupe. The hybrid's scientific name is Cucumis melo L. var. reticulatus Naud. cv. Yubari King.

A top-grade melon is to be perfectly round and have an exceptionally smooth rind. A portion of the stem, which is snipped with scissors, is left on top for aesthetic appeal. Some Japanese people present Yubari King melons as gifts during .

At a Japanese auction in 2008, two Yubari King melons sold together for ¥2.5million. In 2016, Konishi Seika, a fruit and vegetable market in Amagasaki, bought a pair of Yubari King melons at auction with a winning bid of ¥3million. In 2019 Tokyo-based Pokka Sapporo Food & Beverage Ltd bought a pair of Yubari melons at auction for the highest recorded price of ¥5million.

References

Further reading
 

Melons
Yūbari, Hokkaido